Wim Delvoye (born 1965 in Wervik, West Flanders)  is a Belgian neo-conceptual artist known for his inventive and often shocking projects. Much of his work is focused on the body. As the critic Robert Enright wrote in the art magazine Border Crossings, "Delvoye is involved in a way of making art that reorients our understanding of how beauty can be created". Wim Delvoye has an eclectic oeuvre, exposing his interest in a range of themes, from bodily function, and scatology to the function of art in the current market economy, and numerous subjects in between. He lives and works in Ghent (Belgium).

Early life
Delvoye was raised in Wervik, a small town in West Flanders, Belgium. He did not have a religious upbringing but has been influenced by the Roman Catholic architecture that surrounded him. In a conversation with Michaël Amy of the New York Times, Delvoye stated, "I have vivid memories of crowds marching behind a single statue as well as of people kneeling in front of painted and carved altarpieces… Although I was barely aware of the ideas lurking behind these types of images, I soon understood that paintings and sculptures were of great importance".

Career
Growing up, Delvoye attended exhibitions with his parents, and his love of drawing eventually led him to art school, the Royal Academy of Fine Arts (Ghent). Delvoye has said that the pessimistic expectations for Belgian art students freed him, essentially making him realize that he “had nothing to lose”. Shortly thereafter, Delvoye began painting over wallpaper and carpets, coloring in the existing patterns and defying the tendency towards free expression vibrant in the art world at the time.

Delvoye considers himself an originator of concepts—he is attracted initially to the theory behind pieces, instead of the act of painting itself. After 1990, specialists directed by Delvoye have executed most of his work. In 1992, Delvoye received international recognition with the presentation of his “Mosaic” at Documenta IX, a symmetrical display of glazed tiles featuring photographs of his own excrement. The organizer of Documenta IX, Jan Hoet claimed, “The strength of Wim Delvoye lies in his ability to engineer conflict by combining the fine arts and folk art, and playing seriousness against irony.”  Three of his most well known projects are “Cloaca”, “Art Farm”, and a series of Gothic works.

Cloaca

Delvoye is perhaps best known for his digestive machine, Cloaca, which he unveiled at the Museum voor Hedendaagse Kunst, Antwerp, after eight years of consultation with experts in fields ranging from plumbing to gastroenterology. As a comment on the Belgians’ love of fine dining, Cloaca is a large installation that turns food into feces, allowing Delvoye to explore the digestive process. In his large mechanism, food begins at a long, transparent bowl (mouth), travels through a number of machine-like assembly stations, and ends in hard matter which is separated from liquid through a cylinder. Delvoye collects and sells the realistically smelling output, suspended in small jars of resin at his Ghent studio. When asked about his inspiration, Delvoye stated that everything in modern life is pointless. The most useless object he could create was a machine that serves no purpose at all, besides the reduction of food to waste. Cloaca has appeared in many incarnations, including Cloaca Original, Cloaca - New & Improved, Cloaca Turbo, Cloaca Quattro, Cloaca N° 5, and Personal Cloaca. Delvoye also sold specially printed toilet paper as a souvenir of the exhibit. In 2016, 5 rolls from the 2007 Mudam Luxembourg exhibit were offered for re-sale for US$300 through an online vendor.

Commissioned Cloaca for MONA
Previously, Delvoye claimed that he would never sell a Cloaca machine to a museum as he could never trust that the curator would maintain the installation properly. However, after two years of discussion with David Walsh, Delvoye agreed to construct a custom Cloaca built specifically for the Museum of Old and New Art in Hobart, Tasmania. The new installation is suspended from the museum ceiling in a room custom-built for it.

Art Farm
Though Delvoye started tattooing pig skins taken from slaughterhouses in the United States in 1992, he began to tattoo live pigs in 1997. Delvoye was interested in the idea that “the pig would literally grow in value," both in a physical and economic sense. He ultimately moved the operation to an Art Farm in China in 2004. The pigs have been inked with a diverse array of designs, including the trivial, such as skulls and crosses, to Louis Vuitton designs, to designs dictated by the pig's anatomy". In an interview with ArtAsiaPacific's Paul Laster, Delvoye described the process of tattooing a live pig, "we sedate it, shave it and apply Vaseline to its skin".

Gothic works
Delvoye is additionally well known for his “gothic” style work. In 2001, Delvoye, with the help of a radiologist, had several of his friends paint themselves with small amounts of barium, and perform explicit sexual acts in medical X-ray clinics. He then used the X-ray scans to fill gothic window frames instead of classic stained glass. Delvoye suggests that radiography reduces the body to a machine. When he was not an active participant, Delvoye observed from a computer screen in another room, allowing the subjects enough distance to perform normally, although Delvoye has described the whole operation as "very medical, very antiseptic". Delvoye also creates oversized laser-cut steel sculptures of objects typically found in construction (like a cement truck), customized in seventeenth-century Flemish Baroque style. These structures juxtapose "medieval craftsmanship with Gothic filigree". Delvoye brings together the heavy, brute force of contemporary machinery and the delicate craftsmanship associated with Gothic architecture.

In a 2013 show in New York City, Delvoye showed intricate laser-cut works combining architectural and figurative references with shapes such as a Möbius band or a Rorschach inkblot.

See also
Digesting Duck
Useless machine
 Artistic scandal

References

External links

Wim Delvoye's website
Wim Delvoye at Sperone Westwater, New York
Wim Delvoye at ARNDT Berlin
Wim Delvoye at Galerie Emmanuel Perrotin, Miami & Paris
Wim Delvoye on the Time Europe website (2003)
 We Make Money Not Art, "Wim Delvoye: Cloaca 2000-2007"
 Wim Delvoye on Artnet
"Cloaca" exhibition in the New Museum of Contemporary Art, New York (2002)
"Cloaca" - An Interview with Josefina Ayerza
 Interview with Fabian Stech
special interview about the Discobolos in Roubaix city (french language)
norwegian news story about Delvoyes move to China (norwegian language)
Wim Delvoye at the Future Pass exhibition in Venice 2011
Artist's page at Gary Tatintsian Gallery website

1965 births
Living people
People from Wervik
Belgian contemporary artists
Conceptual artists
Animal cruelty incidents
Royal Academy of Fine Arts (Ghent) alumni
Recycled art artists